Clystea is a genus of moths in the subfamily Arctiinae. The genus was described by Watson in 1980.

Species
 Clystea andromacha Fabricius, 1775
 Clystea aner Hampson, 1905
 Clystea carnicauda Butler, 1876
 Clystea daltha Druce, 1895
 Clystea dorsilineata Hampson, 1898
 Clystea eburneifera Felder, 1869
 Clystea frigida Burmeister, 1878
 Clystea fulvicauda Butler, 1896
 Clystea gracilis Möschler, 1877
 Clystea jacksoni Kaye, 1925
 Clystea lepida Draudt, 1915
 Clystea leucaspis Cramer, 1775
 Clystea ocina Druce, 1883
 Clystea paulista Draudt, 1915
 Clystea platyzona Felder, 1869
 Clystea rubipectus Schaus, 1898
 Clystea sanctula Dognin, 1911
 Clystea sarcosoma Butler, 1876
 Clystea serrana Schaus, 1928
 Clystea stipata Walker, 1854
 Clystea tenumarginata Kaye, 1919

References

External links

 
Arctiinae